Biryulyovo Vostochnoye District  is a territorial division (a district, or raion) in Southern Administrative Okrug, one of the 125 in the federal city of Moscow, Russia. It is located in the south of the city and borders with Biryulyovo Zapadnoye in the west, Tsaritsyno in the north, Orekhovo-Borisovo (Severnoye and Yuzhnoye) in the east, and Moscow Ring Road (MKAD) in the south. As of the 2010 Census, the total population of the district was 145,100.

Municipal status
As a municipal division, the district is incorporated as Biryulyovo Vostochnoye Municipal Okrug.

Economy

Transportation
The western border of the district is formed by a railway, and two railway stations (Biryulyovo-Tovarnaya and Biryulyovo-Passazhirskaya) are located in the district. They serve the Paveletsky suburban railway line. Another railway station within the limits of the district is Tsaritsyno serving the Kursky suburban railway line, Moscow, which is located next to the metro station of the same name.

References

Notes

Sources

Districts of Moscow
Southern Administrative Okrug